Mitja Petkovšek (born 6 February 1977 in Ljubljana) is a former Slovenian gymnast. Petkovšek is a specialist on parallel bars, where he is world champion (2005, 2007), World Cup Final champion (2000, 2004), and European champion (2000, 2007, 2008). He has a total of 12 World Championship, World Cup Finals, and European Championship medals, 7 of them gold. He is married to Mojca Rode, a Slovenian rhythmic gymnast. He also competed at the 2000 Summer Olympics and 2008 Summer Olympics.

References

External links
 
 
 

1977 births
Living people
Slovenian male artistic gymnasts
World champion gymnasts
Medalists at the World Artistic Gymnastics Championships
Olympic gymnasts of Slovenia
Gymnasts at the 2000 Summer Olympics
Gymnasts at the 2008 Summer Olympics
Sportspeople from Ljubljana
Universiade medalists in gymnastics
Mediterranean Games bronze medalists for Slovenia
Mediterranean Games medalists in gymnastics
Competitors at the 2001 Mediterranean Games
Competitors at the 2005 Mediterranean Games
Universiade bronze medalists for Slovenia
Medalists at the 1997 Summer Universiade
European champions in gymnastics